Fructan beta-(2,6)-fructosidase (beta-(2-6)-fructan exohydrolase, levanase, 6-FEH, beta-(2,6)-D-fructan fructohydrolase) is an enzyme with systematic name (2->6)-beta-D-fructan fructohydrolase. This enzyme catalyses the following chemical reaction

 Hydrolysis of terminal, non-reducing (2->6)-linked beta-D-fructofuranose residues in fructans

The best substrates are the levan-type fructans such as 6-kestotriose [beta-D-fructofuranosyl-(2->6)-beta-D-fructofuranosyl alpha-D-glucopyranoside] and 6,6-kestotetraose [beta-D-fructofuranosyl-(2->6)-beta-D-fructofuranosyl-(2->6)-beta-D-fructofuranosyl alpha-D-glucopyranoside].

References

External links 
 

EC 3.2.1